Yolano is an unincorporated community in Solano County, California, United States. Yolano is 7 miles (11 km) east-southeast of Dixon and approximately 1 mile (1.6 km) west of the Solano–Yolo County line, which runs due north–south in that area. The name comes from a portmanteau of Yolo County and Solano County.

References

Unincorporated communities in California
Unincorporated communities in Solano County, California